La Ferté Macé is a commune in the Orne department, region of Normandy, northwestern France.

History
During the First World War, the village housed a military detention camp, the Dépôt de Triage. Among others, the American poet E. E. Cummings and his friend William Slater Brown, then volunteers in the Norton-Harjes Ambulance Corps in France, were held there between September 21, 1917 and December 19 of the same year, on charges of "espionage". This was based on their having expressed anti war opinions. Cummings' experiences in the camp at La Ferté-Mace were the basis for his novel, The Enormous Room. The three-building complex, with a church and two classroom buildings, had previously served as a seminary and lycée. The prisoners were kept on the top floor of the largest building, which was open and spanned most of the floor.

On 12 January 2016, the former commune Antoigny was merged into La Ferté-Macé, and the spelling of the new municipality was changed to La Ferté Macé.

In the Middle Ages 
The Château de la Ferté-Macé was built in the first half of the 11th century, on a feudal clod. Geoffrey is the first lord. He certainly built this fortress on the order of the Duke of Normandy.

Mathieu (or Macé),who is said to have given his name to the city, was a companion of William the Conqueror in Hastings in 1066; he was one of the first lords of Ferté-Macé.

The fortress, gradually becoming populated by the inhabitants' search for stately protection, serves as a link to the fortified belt protecting the Duchy of Normandy from the thirsts for conquest of its powerful neighbours, the King of France and the Duke of Anjou. With the integration of the Anglo-Norman domain with Anjou, the Plantagenet empire was further strengthened against the King of France.

In 1205, with the conquest of Normandy by King Philippe-Augustus and his attachment to the Kingdom of France, Ferté-Macé became a royal barony. Guillaume de la Ferté, son of Mathieu (another Mathieu) and Gondrède, who had opposed Philippe-Augusteat the time, abandoned his barony and left to join Jean sans Terre in England. The lord of ferté thus becomes the King of France, who entrusts the barony sometimes to a supporter of the Crown, sometimes to a lord administrator of another domain in the name of the King.

In 1386, a criminal trial in Falaise sentenced to death a special assassin: a pig who had eaten the infant of the mason Souvet in the village. This was common in the Middle Ages, where several excommunications of murderous pigs were reported for the city of Rouen alone and their hanging for similar reasons.

In the 15th century, the castle was destroyed. There is only a large square, located in height on the feudal clod; originally called the "Castle Square", it was recently renamed Neustadt-am-Rübenberge square in honour of the German town of Neustadt am Rübenberge, which was twinned with La Ferté-Macé.

Only the bell tower of the Romanesque church, adjoining the great Church of Our Lady, is preserved from medieval times.

Ferté-Macé survived until the 18th century as a small town of a good thousand inhabitants, living in handicrafts and local trade. This craft, already in the form of home weaving, was a precursor to the following century when the city became a major textile centre.

Population
The population data given in the table below refer to the commune in its geography as of January 2020.

Twin towns
 Ludlow, Shropshire, England
 Savoigne-Biffèche, Senegal
 Neustadt am Rübenberge, Germany
 Saint-Maurice, Quebec, Canada

Heraldry

See also
Communes of the Orne department
Parc naturel régional Normandie-Maine

References

Fertemace
Orne communes articles needing translation from French Wikipedia